Cristian Rotinsulu (born December 20, 1992 in Palembang, South Sumatra) is an Indonesian footballer who currently plays for Sriwijaya in the Indonesia Super League.

Honours

Club honors
Sriwijaya
Indonesia Super League (1): 2012-2013

References

External links

1992 births
Association football forwards
Living people
Indonesian footballers
Liga 1 (Indonesia) players
Sriwijaya F.C. players
Minahasa people
People from Palembang